Ust-Orda Buryat Okrug, or Ust-Orda Buryatia, is an administrative division of Irkutsk Oblast, Russia. It was a federal subject of Russia (an autonomous okrug of Irkutsk Oblast) from 1993 to January 1, 2008, when it merged with Irkutsk Oblast. It also had autonomous okrug status from September 26, 1937 to 1993. Prior to the merger, it was called Ust-Orda Buryat Autonomous Okrug. It is one of the two Buryat okrugs in Russia, the other one is Agin-Buryat Okrug in Zabaykalsky Krai.  

Population: 

The settlement of Ust-Ordynsky is the autonomous okrug's administrative center and its most populous inhabited locality.

Merger
In a referendum held on April 16, 2006, the majority of residents in Irkutsk Oblast and Ust-Orda Buryat Autonomous Okrug agreed to the unification of the two regions. According to regions' electoral commissions, 68.98% of residents of Irkutsk Oblast and 99.51% of residents in Ust-Orda Buryatia took part in the vote, making it one of the best attended plebiscites in the country since the 2003 Russian election. The merger was approved by an absolute majority of the electorate: by 89.77% in Irkutsk Oblast and by 97.79% in Ust-Orda Buryatia.  The enlarged Irkutsk Oblast has officially come into existence on January 1, 2008.

Administrative divisions

The okrug is divided into six administrative districts:

 Alarsky District
 Bayandayevsky District
 Bokhansky District
 Ekhirit-Bulagatsky District
 Nukutsky District
 Osinsky District

Demographics
Population:

Vital statistics
Source: Russian Federal State Statistics Service

Ethnic groups
Of the 135,327 residents (as of the 2002 Census), 38 (0.02%) chose not to specify their ethnic background. Of the rest, residents identified themselves as belonging to 74 ethnic groups, including Russians (54.4%), Buryats (39.6%), Tatars (3%) and Ukrainians (0.96%)

See also
Flag of Ust-Orda Buryat Okrug

References

Irkutsk Oblast
Former administrative units of Russia
Buryat people
States and territories established in 1937
Autonomous okrugs of the Soviet Union
Enclaves and exclaves
Russian-speaking countries and territories